Sophia Christina Amoruso (born April 20, 1984) is an American businesswoman. Amoruso was born in San Diego, California, and moved to Sacramento, California, after High school, soon after relocating to San Francisco. Amoruso founded Nasty Gal, a women's fashion retailer, which went on to be named one of "the fastest growing companies" by Inc. Magazine in 2012. In 2016, she was named one of the richest self-made women in the world by Forbes. However, Nasty Gal filed for bankruptcy. In 2017, Amoruso founded Girlboss Media, a company that creates content for women in the millennial generation to progress as people in their personal and professional life.

Her 2014 autobiography #GIRLBOSS was adapted into a television series of the same name for Netflix.

Early life
Amoruso was born in San Diego, California, in 1984. She is of Greek, Italian, and Portuguese descent. She was raised in the Greek Orthodox church. After being diagnosed with depression and attention deficit hyperactivity disorder (ADHD) in her adolescence, she dropped out of school and began homeschooling to help cope with these issues. Her first job as a teenager was at a Subway restaurant, followed by various odd jobs, including working in a bookstore and a record shop. After high school, her parents divorced and she moved to Sacramento, California to live a more free lifestyle.

As a young adult, Amoruso lived a nomadic lifestyle, hitchhiking on the West Coast, dumpster diving, and stealing. In 2003, while living in Portland, Oregon, she stopped stealing after being caught shoplifting. She left Portland and relocated to San Francisco, shortly after she discovered she had a hernia in her groin. To get the health insurance for surgery, she worked in the Academy of Art University lobby checking student IDs.

Career

eBay store 
At age 22 while working as a security guard at San Francisco's Academy of Art University, Amoruso opened an online eBay store, which she called Nasty Gal Vintage, named after the 1975 album by funk singer and style icon Betty Davis. The store consisted of used vintage clothing and other items. The first item she sold was a book she had stolen as a teenager. She styled, photographed, captioned, and shipped the products herself using what she was taught in a photography class.

Amoruso began her business working out of her bedroom. In 2006, her eBay store Nasty Gal Vintage grew considerably, turning into a 1 million dollar yearly revenue business after 6 years and continuing to grow. Amoruso claims to have been banned from eBay in 2008 for posting hyperlinks in feedback to customers. Following this, she launched Nasty Gal as its own retail website, continuing to grow the business as a stand-alone online store. She has previously stated that she left voluntarily because of the rules preventing sellers from leaving negative feedback for customers. Amoruso was also accused of artificially inflating bids, which she has denied.

Nasty Gal 
Nasty Gal developed an online following of young women on social media. It quickly grew with revenues increasing from $223,000 in 2008 to almost $23 million in 2011. At the peak of Nasty Gal, it was pulling in 100 million in annual sales, with over 200 employees. The New York Times has called her "a Cinderella of tech". In 2013, Inc. Magazine named her to its 30 under 30 list. Also, in 2013, Business Insider named Sophia Amoruso one of the sexiest CEOs alive.

In 2014, Amoruso's autobiography #GIRLBOSS was published by Portfolio, a Penguin imprint that specializes in books about business. In 2016, it was announced that Netflix would be adapting her autobiography into a television series called Girlboss. Amoruso confirms most of the show was accurate to her life. It was cancelled after one season, as it got a sour response from viewers, saying it was a call to millennial narcissists.

In an interview with Dan Schawbel of Forbes, Amoruso admitted that she was unprepared for the demands of being a CEO, having had no previous leadership experience, and advised that people seeking to launch a business first gain managerial experience at established companies.

On January 12, 2015, Amoruso announced she was stepping down as CEO of Nasty Gal, knowing the company could not continue under the current leadership. In November 2016, the company was reported to be filing for Chapter 11 bankruptcy protection, with Amoruso resigning as executive chairwoman. The reason for this bankruptcy can be pointed to leadership changes, a "toxic work culture", and poor communication, among other faults.  February 2017, Boohoo Group purchased Nasty Gal for $20 million, with Nasty Gal remaining in Los Angeles and continuing to produce apparel, shoes, and accessories under its own brand.

Girlboss Media
In December 2017, Amoruso founded Girlboss Media(#girlboss), a company that creates editorial content, videos, and podcasts aimed at a female audience. Since 2017, Amoruso has held Girlboss Rallies, which are weekend-long instructional events for young entrepreneurs for around $500-$1400.

Filmography

Bibliography
 
 

Amoruso also has a chapter giving advice in Tim Ferriss' book Tools of Titans.

References

External links

Girlboss Media official website
Nasty Gal official website

1984 births
21st-century American businesspeople
21st-century American businesswomen
American people of Greek descent
American people of Italian descent
American people of Portuguese descent
Businesspeople from Portland, Oregon
Businesspeople from San Diego
Living people